of Japanese painting was founded in the early Muromachi period (14th–15th centuries), and was devoted to yamato-e, paintings specializing in subject matter and techniques derived from ancient Japanese art, as opposed to schools influenced by Chinese art, notably the Kanō school (狩野派).  Tosa school paintings are characterised by "areas of flat opaque colour enclosed by simple outlines, where drawing is precise and conventional", with many narrative subjects from Japanese literature and history.  However, by the 17th century both Tosa and Kanō artists broadened their range, and the distinction between these and other schools became less clear.

The earliest documentary evidence for an artist using the name Tosa are two early 15th-century references to a man named Fujiwara Yukihiro (藤原 行広) (fl. 1406–1434) who was also known as Tosa Shōgen (土佐 将監), a title derived from his position as governor of Tosa Province. Yukihiro's activity as a painter is known primarily from an inscription on illustrated handscrolls of the Stories of the Origin of Yūzū Nembutsu (融通念仏縁起); 1414, Seiryōji (清涼寺), Kyoto.

A bloodline descent from Yukimitsu to Mitsunobu (father-son?) is speculated, but the family document lacks records covering that period.  Mitsunobu's daughter married Kanō Motonobu, head of the Kanō school, which increased the tendency of Kanō artists, already using two distinct styles, to work in a Tosa style when occasion demanded.  The surviving paintings that can be attributed to Mitsunobu show less quality than his reputation in historical sources would suggest, but many fine works remain from Mitsunobu's hand. Although he painted both Buddhist paintings and portraits in addition to the standard repertoire of courtly themes, he is best known for his illustrated handscrolls, emaki (絵巻), such as The Legends of Kiyomizu-dera (清水寺縁起). 

The headship of the school passed to (1539–1613), whose relationship with his predecessors is uncertain.

Mitsuyoshi eventually left the capital and his post and settled in the city of Sakai (堺), a port city near Osaka, where he sold paintings to the local townspeople. Mitsumochi also moved away from the traditional Tosa themes to specialize in bird-and-flower paintings. During this period, the stewardship of the imperial painting bureau passed from the Tosa school into the hands of Kanō school painters.

Mitsuyoshi's son, Mitsunori (光則) (1583–1638) continued to live and work in Sakai, painting for townsmen, until 1634 when he moved to the capital with his eldest son, Mitsuoki (光起) (1617–1691) at the invitation of Emperor Go-Mizunoo, where Mitsunori began painting ceremonial fans for the court. Twenty years later, in 1654, Mitsuoki won back the position of edokoro-azukari for the family, which enabled him to revive the school.  Mitsuoki rejuvenated the traditional Tosa style by introducing elements from Chinese painting. He is particularly noted for his elegant paintings of quail, as for example, the Chrysanthemum and Quail screens which he painted with the help of his son Mitsunari (光成) (1646–1710).

Mitsuoki's successors headed the Imperial painting bureau until the end of the Edo period, but their reliance on imitating the style of Mitsuoki, rather than developing new techniques or themes, led to the production of works that were increasingly static and conventional.  However, Mitsusada (1738–1806), a dedicated practitioner of the Tosa traditions, managed to effect a temporary Tosa revival.

Artists of the school but not the family were more significant, notably Sumiyoshi Jokei (1599–1670), a pupil of Mitsuyoshi, and his son Gukei Sumiyoshi (1631–1705), whose work revitalized the original tradition of small narrative scrolls with emphasis on details of everyday life.  Reviving interest in Japanese history in the 18th and 19th centuries kept demand for Tosa style work alive, but the style of the school, with its thin line and reliance on detail was less suited to the larger hanging-scrolls that were now the format preferred by patrons.  The interest in painting everyday life of the Tosa school was influential on the ukiyo-e school of paintings and prints, especially on the aristocratic painter Iwasa Matabei (1578–1650), who is regarded as one of the founders of ukiyo-e.

Notable Tosa artists
Tosa Yukihiro
Tosa Mitsunobu
Tosa Mitsuoki
 (1496 – c.1559)
Tosa Mitsumoto (fl. 1530–1569)
Tosa Mitsuyoshi (1539–1613)
Tosa Mitsunori (1583–1638)
Tosa Mitsusada (1738–1806)
Tosa Mitsuzane (1780–1852)
Iwasa Matabei
Awataguchi Takamitsu

Notes

References

Burke, Richard. Murasaki Shikibu: Her Diary and Poetic Memoirs. Princeton University Press, 1982.
McCormick, Melissa. Tosa Mitsunobu and the Small Scroll in Medieval Japan. Seattle: University of Washington Press, 2009. 
Murase, Miyeko. Iconography of The Tale of Genji. Genji Monogatari Ekotoba. New York and Tokyo: Weatherhill, 1983.
The Tale of Genji: Legends and Paintings. Introduction by Miyeko Murase. New York: George Braziller, Inc., 2001 

Watson, William, The Great Japan Exhibition: Art of the Edo Period 1600–1868, 1981, Royal Academy of Arts/Weidenfeld & Nicolson

External links
Momoyama, Japanese Art in the Age of Grandeur, an exhibition catalog from The Metropolitan Museum of Art (fully available online as PDF), which contains material on the Tosa school
Bridge of dreams: the Mary Griggs Burke collection of Japanese art, a catalog from The Metropolitan Museum of Art Libraries (fully available online as PDF), which contains material on the Tosa school (see index)

15th-century establishments in Japan
Schools of Japanese art